Hospital of Lithuanian University of Health Sciences Kaunas Clinics is the largest and the most advanced medical institution in Lithuania and Baltic States. The entire hospital complex is 160 thousand square meters over an area of 36 hectares. Within the 15 on-campus buildings, there are 35 departments with different clinical profiles and 15 departments for out patient care. As of 2009, more than 1,200 medical doctors and 2,500 nursing specialists are working at the hospital. Since 2016 the hospital has been governed by habilitated doctor Renaldas Jurkevičius. Kaunas Clinics performs more than 60,000 operations per annum. Since June 29, 2015 it is the only hospital in Lithuania to have highest level (Level 3) Trauma and Emergency Center for both – adult and children. The Kaunas Clinics is capable of performing the most advanced surgeries, including heart transplants. Compared to other hospitals in Europe, Kaunas clinics is distinguished in the fields of vascular surgery, neurosurgery and otorhinolaryngology.

Name changes
 until 1948 – Vytautas Magnus University Clinics
 1948–1952 – Kaunas Area Clinical Hospital
 1952–1983 – Kaunas Republican Clinical Hospital
 1983–1986 – Clinic of the Ministry of Health BMI
 1986–1990 – Petras Jasinskas Clinic
 1990–1995 – Kaunas Republican Clinical Hospital
 1995–2010 – Kaunas University of Medicine Clinics
 since 2010 – Hospital of Lithuanian University of Health Sciences Kauno klinikos

History
During the interwar period, Lithuanian politicians and medical experts perceived a need for a major hospital complex in the area, and gathered to discuss the possibility on February 5, 1936. Soon afterwards the Lithuanian cabinet adopted a resolution to build a hospital near the Seventh Fort. An international competition was held to select the best project. Six different proposals were submitted, two of them from outside Lithuania. The commission chose proposal "XXX", by the French architects Urbain Cassan and Elie Ouchanoff.

The development of the hospital quickly gained momentum. Urbain Cassan met with physicians to gather feedback and hear specific requests and proposals for the arrangement of rooms. These discussions went on for about ten days. The building commission acted in coordination to review the designs and sketches, which resulted in redesigns of, and improvements to, several aspects of the initial proposal. In 1937 the cornerstone was laid, marking the active phase of construction. The work continued until July 1939; it employed several of the newest building technologies. The hospital complex comprised six buildings, covering about 160,000 square meters, including a 75-meter-tall chimney. Its major buildings were linked through tunnels, with a total length of one kilometer. Cork was used as flooring in the corridors so as to minimize disturbances to patients. The hospital opened in 1940.

When Lithuania was occupied during World War II, the hospital was adjusted to meet its new needs. The buildings were redecorated with camouflage colors. After the war the hospital underwent further expansion. In 1967 a medical research and laboratory complex was built, followed in 1972 by an obstetrical and gynaecology center, and a few years an eye-care clinic was added. Between 1976 and 1982 a cardiac clinic and a neurosurgery center were constructed, and gardens were planted.

The University Hospital complex consisted in 2008 of 15 buildings where approximately two thousand patients could be treated simultaneously. On May 7, 2008 Kaunas University Hospital was declared a cultural monument. On June 1, 2012 the new building for the Clinic of Children's Disease was opened. On June 29, 2015 the new highest level (Level 3) Trauma and Emergency Center for adults and children was opened.

Clinics
 Anesthesia
 Cardiology
 Children's diseases
 Children's surgery
 Dental and oral diseases
 Dental and Maxillary Orthopedics
 Ear, nose, and throat
 Endocrinology
 Eye care
 Family medicine
 Gastroenterology
 General surgery
 Heart, thoracic and vascular surgery
 Hematology
 Infectious diseases
 Intensive care
 Internal diseases
 Laboratory
 Maxillofacial surgery
 Nephrology
 Neonatology
 Neurosurgery
 Neurology
 Obstetrics and Gynecology
 Oncology
 Oral Care and Pediatric Odontology
 Orthodontics
 Orthopedics and Traumatology
 Pathological anatomy
 Pediatric surgery
 Plastic and Reconstructive surgery
 Psychiatry
 Pulmonology and Immunology
 Radiology
 Rehabilitation
 Rheumatology
 Skin and Venereal diseases
 Surgery
 Urology

References

Hospital buildings completed in 1939
Hospitals established in 1939
Hospitals in Kaunas
Hospitals in Lithuania
Teaching hospitals
1939 establishments in Lithuania